

Events

Pre-1600
 367 – Gratian, son of Roman Emperor Valentinian I, is named co-Augustus at the age of eight by his father.
 394 – The Graffito of Esmet-Akhom, the latest known inscription in Egyptian hieroglyphs, is written.
 410 – The Visigoths under king Alaric I begin to pillage Rome.
1185 – Sack of Thessalonica by the Normans.
1200 – King John of England, signer of the first Magna Carta, marries Isabella of Angoulême in Angoulême Cathedral.
1215 – Pope Innocent III issues a bull declaring Magna Carta invalid.
1349 – Six thousand Jews are killed in Mainz after being blamed for the bubonic plague.
1482 – The town and castle of Berwick-upon-Tweed is captured from Scotland by an English army.
1516 – The Ottoman Empire under Selim I defeats the Mamluk Sultanate and captures present-day Syria at the Battle of Marj Dabiq.
1561 – Willem of Orange marries duchess Anna of Saxony.

1601–1900
1608 – The first official English representative to India lands in Surat.
1643 – A Dutch fleet establishes a new colony in the ruins of Valdivia in southern Chile.
1662 – The Act of Uniformity requires England to accept the Book of Common Prayer.
1682 – William Penn receives the area that is now the state of Delaware, and adds it to his colony of Pennsylvania.
1690 – Job Charnock of the East India Company establishes a factory in Calcutta, an event formerly considered the founding of the city (in 2003 the Calcutta High Court ruled that the city's foundation date is unknown).
1743 – The War of the Hats: The Swedish army surrenders to the Russians in Helsinki, ending the war and starting Lesser Wrath.
1781 – American Revolutionary War: A small force of Pennsylvania militia is ambushed and overwhelmed by an American Indian group, which forces George Rogers Clark to abandon his attempt to attack Detroit.
1789 – The first naval battle of the Svensksund began in the Gulf of Finland.
1812 – Peninsular War: A coalition of Spanish, British, and Portuguese forces succeed in lifting the two-and-a-half-year-long Siege of Cádiz.
1814 – British troops invade Washington, D.C. and during the Burning of Washington the White House, the Capitol and many other buildings are set ablaze.
1815 – The modern Constitution of the Netherlands is signed.
1816 – The Treaty of St. Louis is signed in St. Louis, Missouri.
1820 – Constitutionalist insurrection at Oporto, Portugal.
1821 – The Treaty of Córdoba is signed in Córdoba, now in Veracruz, Mexico, concluding the Mexican War of Independence from Spain.
1857 – The Panic of 1857 begins, setting off one of the most severe economic crises in United States history.
1870 – The Wolseley expedition reaches Manitoba to end the Red River Rebellion.
1898 – Count Muravyov, Foreign Minister of Russia presents a rescript that convoked the First Hague Peace Conference.

1901–present
1909 – Workers start pouring concrete for the Panama Canal.
1911 – Manuel de Arriaga is elected and sworn in as the first President of Portugal.
1914 – World War I: German troops capture Namur.
  1914   – World War I: The Battle of Cer ends as the first Allied victory in the war.
1929 – Second day of two-day Hebron massacre during the 1929 Palestine riots: Arab attacks on the Jewish community in Hebron in the British Mandate of Palestine, result in the death of 65–68 Jews; the remaining Jews are forced to flee the city.
1931 – Resignation of the United Kingdom's Second Labour Government. Formation of the UK National Government.
1932 – Amelia Earhart becomes the first woman to fly across the United States non-stop (from Los Angeles to Newark, New Jersey).
1933 – The Crescent Limited train derails in Washington, D.C., after the bridge it is crossing is washed out by the 1933 Chesapeake–Potomac hurricane.
1936 – The Australian Antarctic Territory is created.
1937 – Spanish Civil War: the Basque Army surrenders to the Italian Corpo Truppe Volontarie following the Santoña Agreement.
  1937   – Spanish Civil War: Sovereign Council of Asturias and León is proclaimed in Gijón.
1938 – Kweilin incident: A Japanese warplane shoots down the Kweilin, a Chinese civilian airliner, killing 14. It is the first recorded instance of a civilian airliner being shot down.
1941 – The Holocaust: Adolf Hitler orders the cessation of Nazi Germany's systematic T4 euthanasia program of the mentally ill and the handicapped due to protests, although killings continue for the remainder of the war.
1942 – World War II: The Battle of the Eastern Solomons. Japanese aircraft carrier Ryūjō is sunk, with the loss of seven officers and 113 crewmen. The US carrier  is heavily damaged.
1944 – World War II: Allied troops begin the attack on Paris.
1949 – The treaty creating the North Atlantic Treaty Organization goes into effect.
1950 – Edith Sampson becomes the first black U.S. delegate to the United Nations.
1951 – United Air Lines Flight 615 crashes near Decoto, California, killing 50 people.
1954 – The Communist Control Act goes into effect, outlawing the American Communist Party.
  1954   – Vice president João Café Filho takes office as president of Brazil, following the suicide of Getúlio Vargas.
1963 – Buddhist crisis: As a result of the Xá Lợi Pagoda raids, the US State Department cables the United States Embassy, Saigon to encourage Army of the Republic of Vietnam generals to launch a coup against President Ngô Đình Diệm if he did not remove his brother Ngô Đình Nhu.
1967 – Led by Abbie Hoffman, the Youth International Party temporarily disrupts trading at the New York Stock Exchange by throwing dollar bills from the viewing gallery, causing trading to cease as brokers scramble to grab them.
1970 – Vietnam War protesters bomb Sterling Hall at the University of Wisconsin–Madison, leading to an international manhunt for the perpetrators.
1981 – Mark David Chapman is sentenced to 20 years to life in prison for murdering John Lennon.
1989 – Colombian drug barons declare "total war" on the Colombian government.
  1989   – Tadeusz Mazowiecki is chosen as the first non-communist prime minister in Central and Eastern Europe.
1991 – Mikhail Gorbachev resigns as head of the Communist Party of the Soviet Union.
  1991   – Ukraine declares itself independent from the Soviet Union.
1992 – Hurricane Andrew makes landfall in Homestead, Florida as a Category 5 hurricane, causing up to $25 billion (1992 USD) in damages.
1995 – Microsoft Windows 95 was released to the public in North America.
1998 – First radio-frequency identification (RFID) human implantation tested in the United Kingdom.
2001 – Air Transat Flight 236 loses all engine power over the Atlantic Ocean, forcing the pilots to conduct an emergency landing in the Azores.
2004 – Ninety passengers die after two airliners explode after flying out of Domodedovo International Airport, near Moscow. The explosions are caused by suicide bombers from Chechnya.
2006 – The International Astronomical Union (IAU) redefines the term "planet" such that Pluto is now considered a dwarf planet.
2008 – Sixty-five passengers are killed when Iran Aseman Airlines Flight 6895 crashes during an emergency landing at Manas International Airport in Bishkek, Kyrgyzstan.
  2008   – A Cessna 208 Caravan crashes in Cabañas, Zacapa, Guatemala, killing 11 people.
2010 – In San Fernando, Tamaulipas, Mexico, 72 illegal immigrants are killed by Los Zetas and eventually found dead by Mexican authorities.
  2010   – Henan Airlines Flight 8387 crashes at Yichun Lindu Airport in Yichun, Heilongjiang, China, killing 44 out of the 96 people on board.
  2010   – Agni Air Flight 101 crashes near Shikharpur, Makwanpur, Nepal, killing all 14 people on board.
2012 – Anders Behring Breivik, perpetrator of the 2011 Norway attacks, is sentenced to 21 years of preventive detention.
2014 – A magnitude 6.0 earthquake strikes the San Francisco Bay Area; it is the largest in that area since 1989.
2016 – An earthquake strikes Central Italy with a magnitude of 6.2, with aftershocks felt as far as Rome and Florence. Around 300 people are killed.
2017 – The National Space Agency of Taiwan successfully launches the observation satellite Formosat-5 into space.
2020 – Erin O’Toole is elected leader of the Conservative Party of Canada.

Births

Pre-1600
1016 – Fujiwara no Genshi, Japanese empress consort (d. 1039)
1113 – Geoffrey Plantagenet, Count of Anjou (d. 1151)
1198 – Alexander II of Scotland (d. 1249)
1358 – John I of Castile (d. 1390)
1393 – Arthur III, Duke of Brittany (d. 1458)
1423 – Thomas Rotherham, English cleric (d. 1500)
1498 – John, Hereditary Prince of Saxony (d. 1537)
1510 – Elisabeth of Brandenburg, Duchess of Brunswick-Calenberg-Göttingen (d. 1558)
1552 – Lavinia Fontana, Italian painter and educator (d. 1614)
1556 – Sophia Brahe, Danish horticulturalist and astronomer (d. 1643)
1561 – Thomas Howard, 1st Earl of Suffolk (d. 1626)
1578 – John Taylor, English poet and author (d. 1653)
1591 – Robert Herrick, English poet and cleric (d. 1674)

1601–1900
1631 – Philip Henry, English minister (d. 1696)
1635 – Peder Griffenfeld, Danish lawyer and politician (d. 1699)
1684 – Sir Robert Munro, 6th Baronet, British politician (d. 1746)
1714 – Alaungpaya, Burmese king (d. 1760)
1758 – Duchess Sophia Frederica of Mecklenburg-Schwerin (d. 1794)
1759 – William Wilberforce, English philanthropist and politician (d. 1833)
1772 – William I of the Netherlands (d. 1840)
1787 – James Weddell, Belgian-English sailor, hunter, and explorer (d. 1834)
1824 – Antonio Stoppani, Italian geologist and scholar (d. 1891)
1837 – Théodore Dubois, French organist, composer, and educator (d. 1924)
1843 – Boyd Dunlop Morehead, Australian politician, 10th Premier of Queensland (d. 1905)
1845 – James Calhoun, American lieutenant (d. 1876)
1851 – Tom Kendall, Australian cricketer and journalist (d. 1924)
1860 – David Bowman, Australian lawyer and politician (d. 1916)
1862 – Zonia Baber, American geographer and geologist (d. 1956)
1863 – Dragutin Lerman, Croatian explorer (d. 1918)
1865 – Ferdinand I of Romania (d. 1927)
1872 – Max Beerbohm, English essayist, parodist, and caricaturist (d. 1956)
1884 – Earl Derr Biggers, American author and playwright (d. 1933)
1887 – Harry Hooper, American baseball player (d. 1974)
1888 – Valentine Baker, Welsh co-founder of the Martin-Baker Aircraft Company (d. 1942)
1890 – Duke Kahanamoku, American swimmer, actor, and surfer (d. 1968)
  1890   – Jean Rhys, Dominican-English novelist (d. 1979)
1893 – Haim Ernst Wertheimer, German-Israeli biochemist and academic (d. 1978)
1895 – Richard Cushing, American cardinal (d. 1970)
1897 – Fred Rose, American pianist, songwriter, and publisher (d. 1954)
1898 – Malcolm Cowley, American novelist, poet, literary critic  (d. 1989)
1899 – Jorge Luis Borges, Argentine short-story writer, essayist, poet and translator (d. 1986)
  1899   – Albert Claude, Belgian biologist and academic, Nobel Prize laureate (d. 1983)

1901–present
1901 – Preston Foster, American actor (d. 1970)
1902 – Fernand Braudel, French historian and academic (d. 1985)
  1902   – Carlo Gambino, Italian-American mob boss (d. 1976)
1903 – Karl Hanke, German businessman and politician (d. 1945)
1904 – Ida Cook, English campaigner for Jewish refugees, and romantic novelist as Mary Burchell (d. 1986)
1905 – Arthur "Big Boy" Crudup, American singer-songwriter and guitarist (d. 1974)
  1905   – Siaka Stevens, Sierra Leonean police officer and politician, 1st President of Sierra Leone (d. 1988)
1907 – Bruno Giacometti, Swiss architect, designed the Hallenstadion (d. 2012)
1908 – Shivaram Rajguru, Indian activist (d. 1931)
1909 – Ronnie Grieveson, South African cricketer and soldier (d. 1998)
1913 – Charles Snead Houston, American physician and mountaineer (d. 2009)
1915 – Wynonie Harris, American singer and guitarist (d. 1969)
  1915   – James Tiptree Jr. (Alice Bradley Sheldon), American psychologist and science fiction author (d. 1987)
1918 – Sikander Bakht, Indian field hockey player and politician, Indian Minister of External Affairs (d. 2004)
1919 – Tosia Altman, member of the Polish resistance in World War II (d. 1943)
  1919   – J. Gordon Edwards, American entomologist, mountaineer, and DDT advocate (d. 2004)
  1919   – Enrique Llanes, Mexican wrestler (d. 2004)
1920 – Alex Colville, Canadian painter and academic (d. 2013)
1921 – Eric Simms, English ornithologist and conservationist (d. 2009)
1922 – René Lévesque, Canadian journalist and politician, 23rd Premier of Quebec (d. 1987)
  1922   – Howard Zinn, American historian, author, and activist (d. 2010)
1923 – Arthur Jensen, American psychologist and academic (d. 2012)
1924 – Alyn Ainsworth, English singer and conductor (d. 1990)
  1924   – Louis Teicher, American pianist (d. 2008)
1926 – Nancy Spero, American painter and academic (d. 2009)
1927 – Anjali Devi, Indian actress and producer (d. 2014)
  1927   – David Ireland, Australian author and playwright (d. 2022)
  1927   – Harry Markowitz, American economist and academic, Nobel Prize laureate
  1929   – Betty Dodson, American author and educator (d. 2020)
1930 – Jackie Brenston, American singer-songwriter and saxophonist (d. 1979)
  1930   – Roger McCluskey, American race car driver (d. 1993)
1932 – Robert D. Hales, American captain and religious leader (d. 2017)
  1932   – Richard Meale, Australian pianist and composer (d. 2009)
  1932   – Cormac Murphy-O'Connor, English cardinal (d. 2017)
1933 – Prince Rupert Loewenstein, Spanish-English banker and manager (d. 2014)
1934 – Kenny Baker, English actor (d. 2016)
1936 – A. S. Byatt, English novelist and poet
  1936   – Kenny Guinn, American banker and politician, 27th Governor of Nevada (d. 2010)
  1936   – Arthur B. C. Walker Jr., American physicist and academic (d. 2001)
1937 – Moshood Abiola, Nigerian businessman and politician (d. 1998)
  1937   – Susan Sheehan, Austrian-American journalist and author
1938 – David Freiberg, American singer and bass player
  1938   – Mason Williams, American guitarist and composer
1940 – Madsen Pirie, British academic, President and co-founder of the Adam Smith Institute
  1940   – Francine Lalonde, Canadian educator and politician (d. 2014)
  1940   – Keith Savage, English rugby player
1941 – Alan M. Roberts, English academic, Professor of Zoology at the University of Bristol
1942 – Max Cleland, American captain and politician (d. 2021)
  1942   – Jimmy Soul, American pop-soul singer (d. 1988)
1943 – John Cipollina, American rock guitarist (d. 1989)
1944 – Bill Goldsworthy, Canadian-American ice hockey player and coach (d. 1996)
  1944   – Gregory Jarvis, American engineer, and astronaut (d. 1986)
  1944   – Rocky Johnson, Canadian-American wrestler and trainer (d. 2020)
1945 – Ronee Blakley, American singer-songwriter, producer, and actress 
  1945   – Molly Duncan, Scottish saxophonist (d. 2019)
  1945   – Ken Hensley, English rock singer-songwriter and musician (d. 2020)
  1945   – Marsha P. Johnson, American gay liberation activist and drag queen (d. 1992)
  1945   – Vince McMahon, American wrestler, promoter, and entrepreneur; co-founded WWE
1947 – Anne Archer, American actress and producer
  1947   – Paulo Coelho, Brazilian author and songwriter
  1947   – Roger De Vlaeminck, Belgian cyclist and coach
  1947   – Joe Manchin, American politician, 34th Governor of West Virginia
  1947   – Vladimir Masorin, Russian admiral
1948 – Kim Sung-il, South Korean commander and pilot
  1948   – Jean Michel Jarre, French pianist, composer, and producer
  1948   – Sauli Niinistö, Finnish captain and politician, 12th President of Finland
  1948   – Alexander McCall Smith, Rhodesian-Scottish author and educator
1949 – Stephen Paulus, American composer and educator (d. 2014)
1951 – Danny Joe Brown, American southern rock singer-songwriter and musician (d. 2005)
  1951   – Orson Scott Card, American novelist, critic, public speaker, essayist, and columnist
  1951   – Oscar Hijuelos, American author and academic (d. 2013)
1952 – Marion Bloem, Dutch author, director, and painter
  1952   – Linton Kwesi Johnson, Jamaican dub poet
1953 – Sam Torrance, Scottish golfer and sportscaster
1954 – Alain Daigle, Canadian ice hockey player
  1954   – Heini Otto, Dutch footballer, coach, and manager
1955 – Mike Huckabee, American minister and politician, 44th Governor of Arkansas
1956 – Gerry Cooney, American boxer
  1956   – Dick Lee, Singaporean singer-songwriter and playwright
1957 – Jeffrey Daniel, American singer-songwriter and dancer
  1957   – Stephen Fry, English actor, journalist, producer, and screenwriter
1958 – Steve Guttenberg, American actor and producer
1959 – Meg Munn, English social worker and politician
1960 – Cal Ripken Jr., American baseball player and coach
1961 – Jared Harris, English actor
1962 – Emile Roemer, Dutch educator and politician
1963 – Hideo Kojima, Japanese director, screenwriter and video game designer
  1963   – Francis Pangilinan, Filipino lawyer and politician
1964 – Éric Bernard, French racing driver
  1964   – Mark Cerny, American video game designer, programmer, producer and business executive
  1964   – Salizhan Sharipov, Kyrgyzstani-Russian lieutenant, pilot, and astronaut
1965 – Marlee Matlin, American actress and producer
  1965   – Reggie Miller, American basketball player and sportscaster
  1965   – Brian Rajadurai, Sri Lankan-Canadian cricketer
1967 – Michael Thomas, English footballer
1968 – Benoît Brunet, Canadian ice hockey player and sportscaster
  1968   – Shoichi Funaki, Japanese-American wrestler and sportscaster
  1968   – Andreas Kisser, Brazilian guitarist, songwriter, and producer
  1968   – Tim Salmon, American baseball player and sportscaster
1969 – Jans Koerts, Dutch cyclist
1970 – Rich Beem, American golfer
  1970   – Tugay Kerimoğlu, Turkish footballer and manager
1972 – Jean-Luc Brassard, Canadian skier and radio host
  1972   – Ava DuVernay, American director and screenwriter
  1972   – Todd Young, American politician
1973 – Andrew Brunette, Canadian ice hockey player and coach
  1973   – Dave Chappelle, American comedian, actor, producer and screenwriter
  1973   – Inge de Bruijn, Dutch swimmer
1974 – Jennifer Lien, American actress
1975 – Roberto Colombo, Italian footballer
  1975   – Mark de Vries, Surinamese-Dutch footballer
  1976   – Simon Dennis, English rower and academic
  1976   – Alex O'Loughlin, Australian actor, writer, director, and producer
1977 – Denílson de Oliveira Araújo, Brazilian footballer
  1977   – Robert Enke, German footballer (d. 2009)
  1977   – Per Gade, Danish footballer
  1977   – John Green, American author and vlogger
  1977   – Jürgen Macho, Austrian footballer
1979 – Vahur Afanasjev, Estonian author and poet
  1979   – Orlando Engelaar, Dutch footballer
  1979   – Michael Redd, American basketball player
1982 – José Bosingwa, Portuguese footballer
  1982   – Kim Källström, Swedish footballer
1983 – George Perris, Greek-French singer-songwriter and pianist
1984 – Erin Molan, Australian journalist and sportscaster
  1984   – Charlie Villanueva, American basketball player
1986 – Joseph Akpala, Nigerian footballer
1987 – Anže Kopitar, Slovenian ice hockey player
1988 – Rupert Grint, English actor
  1988   – Manu Ma'u, New Zealand rugby league player
  1988   – Maya Yoshida, Japanese footballer
1989 – Reynaldo, Brazilian footballer
  1989   – Rocío Igarzábal, Argentinian actress and singer
1990 – Juan Pedro Lanzani, Argentinian actor and singer
1991 – Wang Zhen, Chinese race walker
1992 – Jemerson, Brazilian footballer
1993 – Allen Robinson, American football player
  1993   – Maryna Zanevska, Belgian tennis player
1995 – Lady Amelia Windsor, member of the British royal family
1997 – Alan Walker, British-Norwegian DJ and record producer
2001 – Mildred Maldonado, Mexican rhythmic gymnast

Deaths

Pre-1600
 691 – Fu Youyi, official of the Tang Dynasty
 842 – Saga, Japanese emperor (b. 786)
 895 – Guthred, king of Northumbria
 927 – Doulu Ge, chancellor of Later Tang
   927   – Wei Yue, chancellor of Later Tang
 942 – Liu, empress dowager of Later Jin
 948 – Zhang Ye, Chinese general and chancellor
1042 – Michael V Kalaphates, Byzantine emperor (b. 1015)
1103 – Magnus Barefoot, Norwegian king (b. 1073)
1217 – Eustace the Monk, French pirate (b. 1170)
1313 – Henry VII, Holy Roman Emperor (b. 1275)
1372 – Casimir III, Duke of Pomerania (b. 1348)
1497 – Sophie of Pomerania, Duchess of Pomerania (b. 1435)
1507 – Cecily of York, English princess (b. 1469)
1540 – Parmigianino, Italian painter and etcher (b. 1503)
1542 – Gasparo Contarini, Italian cardinal (b. 1483)
1572 – Gaspard II de Coligny, French admiral (b. 1519)
  1572   – Charles de Téligny, French soldier and diplomat (b. 1535)
1595 – Thomas Digges, English mathematician and astronomer (b. 1546)

1601–1900
1617 – Rose of Lima, Peruvian saint (b. 1586)
1647 – Nicholas Stone, English sculptor and architect (b. 1586)
1679 – Jean François Paul de Gondi, French cardinal and author (b. 1614)
1680 – Thomas Blood, Irish colonel (b. 1618)
  1680   – Ferdinand Bol, Dutch painter and etcher (b. 1616)
1683 – John Owen, English theologian and academic (b. 1616)
1759 – Ewald Christian von Kleist, German poet and soldier (b. 1715)
1770 – Thomas Chatterton, English poet and prodigy (b. 1752)
1779 – Cosmas of Aetolia, Greek monk and saint (b. 1714)
1798 – Thomas Alcock, English priest and author (b. 1709)
1804 – Peggy Shippen, American wife of Benedict Arnold and American Revolutionary War spy (b. 1760)
1818 – James Carr, American lawyer and politician (b. 1777)
1821 – John William Polidori, English writer and physician (b. 1795)
1832 – Nicolas Léonard Sadi Carnot, French physicist and engineer (b. 1796)
1832 – Richard Weymouth, British Royal Navy commander (b. 1780/81)
1838 – Ferenc Kölcsey, Hungarian poet, critic, and politician (b. 1790)
1841 – Theodore Hook, English civil servant and composer (b. 1788)
  1841   – John Ordronaux, French-American soldier (b. 1778)
1888 – Rudolf Clausius, German physicist and mathematician (b. 1822)
1895 – Albert F. Mummery, English mountaineer and author (b. 1855)

1901–present
1923 – Kate Douglas Wiggin, American author and educator (b. 1856)
1930 – Tom Norman, English businessman and showman (b. 1860)
1932 – Kate M. Gordon, American activist (b. 1861)
1939 – Frederick Carl Frieseke, American painter and educator (b. 1874)
1940 – Paul Gottlieb Nipkow, Polish-German technician and inventor, invented the Nipkow disk (b. 1860)
1943 – Antonio Alice, Argentinian painter and educator (b. 1886)
  1943   – Simone Weil, French philosopher and activist (b. 1909)
1946 – James Clark McReynolds, American lawyer and judge, 48th United States Attorney General (b. 1862)
1954 – Getúlio Vargas, Brazilian lawyer and politician, 14th President of Brazil (b. 1882)
1956 – Kenji Mizoguchi, Japanese director and screenwriter (b. 1898)
1958 – Paul Henry, Irish painter and educator (b. 1876)
1967 – Henry J. Kaiser, American businessman, founded Kaiser Shipyards and Kaiser Aluminum (b. 1882)
1974 – Alexander P. de Seversky, Russian-American pilot and businessman, co-founded Republic Aviation (b. 1894)
1977 – Buddy O'Connor, Canadian ice hockey player (b. 1916)
1978 – Louis Prima, American singer-songwriter, trumpet player, and actor (b. 1910)
1979 – Hanna Reitsch, German soldier and pilot (b. 1912)
1980 – Yootha Joyce, English actress (b. 1927)
1982 – Félix-Antoine Savard, Canadian priest and author (b. 1896)
1983 – Kalevi Kotkas, Estonian-Finnish high jumper and discus thrower (b. 1913)
  1983   – Scott Nearing, American economist, educator, and activist (b. 1883)
1985 – Paul Creston, American composer and educator (b. 1906)
1987 – Malcolm Kirk, English rugby player and wrestler (b. 1936)
1990 – Sergei Dovlatov, Russian-American journalist and author (b. 1941)
  1990   – Gely Abdel Rahman, Sudanese-Egyptian poet and academic (b. 1931)
1991 – Bernard Castro, Italian-American inventor (b. 1904)
1992 – André Donner, Dutch academic and judge (b. 1918)
1997 – Luigi Villoresi, Italian racing driver (b. 1907)
1998 – E. G. Marshall, American actor (b. 1910)
1999 – Mary Jane Croft, American actress (b. 1916)
  1999   – Alexandre Lagoya, Egyptian guitarist and composer (b. 1929)
2000 – Andy Hug, Swiss martial artist and kick-boxer (b. 1964)
2001 – Jane Greer, American actress (b. 1924)
  2001   – Roman Matsov, Estonian violinist, pianist, and conductor (b. 1917)
2002 – Nikolay Guryanov, Russian priest and mystic (b. 1909)
2003 – Wilfred Thesiger, Ethiopian-English explorer and author (b. 1910)
2004 – Elisabeth Kübler-Ross, Swiss-American psychiatrist and academic (b. 1926)
2006 – Rocco Petrone, American soldier and engineer (b. 1926)
  2006   – Léopold Simoneau, Canadian tenor and educator (b. 1916)
2007 – Andrée Boucher, Canadian educator and politician, 39th Mayor of Quebec City (b. 1937)
  2007   – Aaron Russo, American director and producer (b. 1943)
2010 – Satoshi Kon, Japanese director and screenwriter (b. 1963)
2011 – Seyhan Erözçelik, Turkish poet and author (b. 1962)
  2011   – Mike Flanagan, American baseball player, coach, and sportscaster (b. 1951)
2012 – Dadullah, Pakistani Taliban leader (b. 1965)
  2012   – Pauli Ellefsen, Faroese surveyor and politician, 6th Prime Minister of the Faroe Islands (b. 1936)
  2012   – Steve Franken, American actor (b. 1932)
  2012   – Félix Miélli Venerando, Brazilian footballer and manager (b. 1937)
2013 – Gerry Baker, American soccer player and manager (b. 1938)
  2013   – Nílton de Sordi, Brazilian footballer and manager (b. 1931)
  2013   – Julie Harris, American actress (b. 1925)
  2013   – Muriel Siebert, American businesswoman and philanthropist (b. 1928)
2014 – Richard Attenborough, English actor, director, producer, and politician (b. 1923)
  2014   – Antônio Ermírio de Moraes, Brazilian businessman (b. 1928)
2015 – Charlie Coffey, American football player and coach (b. 1934)
  2015   – Joseph F. Traub, German-American computer scientist and academic (b. 1932)
  2015   – Justin Wilson, English racing driver (b. 1978)
2016 – Walter Scheel, German politician, 4th President of Germany (b. 1919)
2017 – Jay Thomas, American actor, comedian, and radio talk show host (b. 1948)
2020 – Gail Sheehy,  American author, journalist, and lecturer (b. 1936) 
2021 – Charlie Watts, English musician (b. 1941)

Holidays and observances
Christian feast day:
Abbán of Ireland
Aurea of Ostia
Bartholomew the Apostle (Roman Catholic, Anglican)
Jeanne-Antide Thouret
Maria Micaela Desmaisieres
Massa Candida (Martyrs of Utica)
Owen (Audoin)
August 24 (Eastern Orthodox liturgics)
Flag Day (Liberia)
Independence Day or Den' Nezalezhnosti, celebrates the independence of Ukraine from the Soviet Union in 1991.
International Strange Music Day
National Waffle Day (United States)
Nostalgia Night (Uruguay)
Willka Raymi (Cusco, Peru)
Kobe Bryant Day, a proposed federal holiday in the United States, in reference to his 2 jersey numbers, as well as the day after his birthday

References

External links

Days of the year
August